New Cordell is a city in, and county seat of, Washita County, Oklahoma, United States. It lies along U.S. Route 183. The population was 2,915 at the 2010 census. The community was previously established a few miles from the current site, but was moved about 1900.  It was named for a U.S. Postal Service employee in Washington D. C., Wayne W. Cordell. The official name is New Cordell, though it is now commonly called Cordell.

History
Cordell began when H. D. Young opened a general store about 1.5 miles east of the present town, shortly after the Cheyenne and Arapaho lands were opened for non-Indian settlement in 1892. A post office named Cordell was established in the same year in Young's store. In 1897, A. J. Johnson and J. C. Harrell convinced Young to move his store to the present site, where water was more plentiful and of better quality than in Old Cordell. The new location became known as New Cordell. In 1900, Washita County residents voted to move the county seat from the town of Cloud Chief to New Cordell. The move was challenged in the court as illegal, because only the territorial legislature could authorize such an action. In 1904, the Oklahoma Territorial Supreme Court ruled that the county seat must return to Cloud Chief. A Cordell attorney, Sam Massengale, traveled to Washington, where he lobbied for a bill to make Cordell the official county seat. The bill passed the U. S. Congress in 1906.

The county courthouse was destroyed by a fire in 1909. It was rebuilt by 1911 by the same architect who designed the Oklahoma State Capitol. Governor George Nigh called it, "...godfather of all courthouses in the state of Oklahoma."  The Washita County Courthouse is listed on the National Register of Historic Places. In 1911, the Carnegie Foundation approved a grant to construct what became known as the Cordell Carnegie Community Library.

Geography
The city is located approximately in the center of the county.

Climate
Like most of Oklahoma, New Cordell has a humid subtropical climate (Köppen Cfa), although it is nearly dry enough to qualify as a cool semi-arid climate (BSk). Summers are hot to sweltering, and typically dry, whilst winters average cool by afternoon and freezing by morning but show extreme variation from very warm due to descending chinook winds to frigid periods dominated by Arctic air masses. The heaviest precipitation occurs in the spring from thunderstorms, although occasionally remnant rain depressions in summer and fall provide very heavy rain.

Demographics

As of the census of 2000, there were 2,867 people, 1,192 households, and 816 families residing in the city. The population density was 1,132.3 people per square mile (437.5/km). There were 1,427 housing units at an average density of 563.6 per square mile (217.8/km). The racial makeup of the city was 95.33% White, 0.21% African American, 2.09% Native American, 0.17% Asian, 0.94% from other races, and 1.26% from two or more races. Hispanic or Latino of any race were 2.62% of the population.

There were 1,192 households, out of which 32.3% had children under the age of 18 living with them, 55.2% were married couples living together, 10.1% had a female householder with no husband present, and 31.5% were non-families. 28.4% of all households were made up of individuals, and 14.6% had someone living alone who was 65 years of age or older. The average household size was 2.39 and the average family size was 2.92.

In the city, the population was spread out, with 25.9% under the age of 18, 7.5% from 18 to 24, 26.1% from 25 to 44, 22.1% from 45 to 64, and 18.4% who were 65 years of age or older. The median age was 39 years. For every 100 females, there were 90.9 males. For every 100 females age 18 and over, there were 86.4 males.

The median income for a household in the city was $28,053, and the median income for a family was $34,519. Males had a median income of $24,531 versus $18,173 for females. The per capita income for the city was $15,509. About 15.4% of families and 17.3% of the population were below the poverty line, including 25.9% of those under age 18 and 9.2% of those age 65 or over.

Education
 Cordell Public Schools
 Western Technology Center
 Southwestern Oklahoma State University

Notable people
 Batsell Barrett Baxter
 Betty Ann Elliott
 Glenn English
 Yvonne Kauger
 Kelly Mantle

References

External links
 Cordell Chamber of Commerce
 Encyclopedia of Oklahoma History and Culture - "Cordell"

Cities in Oklahoma
Cities in Washita County, Oklahoma
County seats in Oklahoma